This is a list of events from British radio in 1940.

Events

January
7 January – The BBC Forces Programme begins broadcasting in the United Kingdom; it becomes the most popular channel among civilians at home as well as its primary target audience.

February
 25 February – The Proud Valley is the first known film to have its première on radio when the BBC broadcasts a 60-minute version.
 29 February – Welsh Rarebit first broadcast by the BBC from its Cardiff studio; the resident 25-strong male voice choir, the Lyrian Singers, premieres the song "We'll Keep a Welcome" with music by the programme's producer Mai Jones.

March
No events.

April
No events.

May
 May – The evacuated BBC Radio Variety Department relocates to Bangor in north Wales from where it will broadcast until August 1943.
 10 May (9.00 pm) – Neville Chamberlain makes the first public announcement of his resignation as Prime Minister of the United Kingdom, and his replacement by Winston Churchill, on the BBC Home Service.
 14 May – BBC reporter Charles Gardner working in Reims incorporates the live sounds of a German air raid in a broadcast report.

June
 2 June – Secretary of State for War Anthony Eden gives a radio address claiming success of the Dunkirk evacuation.
 5 June – Yorkshire-born novelist and playwright J. B. Priestley broadcasts his first Sunday evening radio Postscript, "An excursion to hell", on the BBC Home Service, marking the role of the pleasure steamers in the Dunkirk evacuation, just completed.
 18 June
 General Charles de Gaulle, de facto leader of the Free French Forces in World War II, uses the airwaves of the BBC to make his Appeal of 18 June from London to the French people for resistance to the German occupation of France.
 Prime minister Winston Churchill repeats his "This was their finest hour" speech, made earlier to the House of Commons, on the BBC Home Service.
 23 June – Music While You Work debuts on the BBC Home Service (mornings) and BBC Forces Programme (afternoons).
26 June – Secretary of State for War Anthony Eden broadcasts to the British people.

July
 14 July – The BBC Home Service 9.00 pm news bulletin includes a vivid account of an air battle over the English Channel recorded live the previous day by reporter Charles Gardner. The bulletin is preceded by a speech by Churchill, "The War of the Unknown Warriorsˮ, and followed by J. B. Priestley's Postscript describing the seaside resort of Margate in wartime.
 19 July – Adolf Hitler makes a peace appeal to Britain in an address to the Reichstag, broadcast simultaneously in English translation by Paul Schmidt. BBC German-language broadcaster Sefton Delmer unofficially rejects it at once and Lord Halifax, British foreign minister, flatly rejects peace terms in a broadcast reply on 22 July.

August
 August – This year's National Eisteddfod of Wales becomes a purely radio event, with broadcasts on the BBC Home Service.
 10 August – This and the following year's abbreviated seasons of The Proms are without sponsorship by the BBC.

September
No events.

October
 15 October – Seven staff are killed when an attempt to eject a delayed-action German bomb from Broadcasting House in London fails.

November
No events.

December
No events.

Station debuts
7 January: BBC Forces Programme (1940–1944)

Debuts
 13 January –  Garrison Theatre, BBC Home Service, later Forces Programme (1940–1941)
 29 February – Welsh Rarebit, BBC Forces Programme (1940–1944, 1948–1952)
 23 June – Music While You Work, BBC Home Service and BBC Forces Programme (1940–1967)
 14 July – Sunday Half Hour, BBC Home Service (1940–2018)

Continuing radio programmes

1930s
 In Town Tonight (1933–1960)

Births
 1 April – Annie Nightingale, radio music presenter
 10 April – Gloria Hunniford, Northern Irish broadcast presenter
 21 May – Ronan O'Rahilly, Irish-born media entrepreneur (died 2020)
 11 July – Tommy Vance, radio broadcaster (died 2005)
 17 July – Tim Brooke-Taylor, broadcast comedy performer (died 2020)
 13 November – Wally K. Daly, radio scriptwriter (died 2020)
 Dickie Arbiter, royal broadcast presenter

Deaths
 9 April – Mrs. Patrick Campbell, actress, 72 
 30 October – Hilda Matheson, pioneering radio talks producer, 52 (Graves' disease)

See also 
 1940 in British music
 1940 in British television
 1940 in the United Kingdom
 List of British films of 1940

References 

 
Years in British radio
Radio